Pigs Have Wings is a 1977 Italian drama film directed by Paolo Pietrangeli and based on the book of the same name by Lidia Ravera and . It was entered into the 27th Berlin International Film Festival.

Cast
 Franco Bianchi as Rocco
 Lou Castel as Marcello
 Benedetta Fantoli
 Susanna Javicoli as Carla, Marcello's wife
 Marco Lucantoni
 Cristiana Mancinelli as Antonia
 Anna Nogara

References

External links

1977 films
1970s Italian-language films
1977 drama films
Films set in Rome
Films directed by Paolo Pietrangeli
Italian LGBT-related films
1970s Italian films